The 2017–18 Ural season was the club's fifth successive season that the club played in the Russian Premier League, the highest tier of association football in Russia. Ural finished the season in twelfth place and were knocked out of the Russian Cup at the Round of 32 stage by Shinnik Yaroslavl.

Squad

 (captain)

Out on loan

Youth team
As per Russian Football Premier League.

Transfers

Summer

In:

Out:

Winter

In:

Out:

Competitions

Russian Premier League

Results by round

Results

League table

Russian Cup

Squad statistics

Appearances and goals

|-
|colspan="14"|Players away from the club on loan:

|-
|colspan="14"|Players who appeared for Ural Yekaterinburg no longer at the club:

|}

Goal scorers

Disciplinary record

References

External links

FC Ural Yekaterinburg seasons
Ural Yekaterinburg